The common palmar digital nerves of the ulnar nerve are nerves of the hand. The nerve branches off the superficial branch of the ulnar nerve and runs toward the cleft between the ring and little fingers.

Additional images

References

Sources

Nerves of the upper limb